The so-called Tiberina Republic was a revolutionary municipality proclaimed on 4 February 1798, when republicans took power in the city of Perugia. It was an occupation zone that took its name from the river Tiber. A month later, the government of all the Papal States was changed into a republic: the Roman Republic, which Perugia belonged to. Its head was a consul and it used a tricolor similar to the French flag.

References

States and territories established in 1798
States and territories disestablished in 1798
French military occupations
Perugia
Italian states
Client states of the Napoleonic Wars
1798 in Europe
History of Umbria